Halima Khatun (25 August 1933 – 3 July 2018) was a Bangladeshi activist, writer and academic. She took part in Bengali Language Movement in 1952 along with other activists including Rawshan Ara Bachchu. She was the recipient of Bangla Academy Literary Award in 1981 and Ekushey Padak posthumously in 2019.

Early life and education
Khatun was born in Bagerhat in the then British India to Maulovi Abdur Rahman and Doulatunnesa. She completed her master's in English literature from the University of Dhaka and later in Bengali from Rajshahi University. She earned her PhD in education from the University of Northern Colorado in 1968.

Career
Khatun began her teaching career at Khulna Coronation School and RK Girls College. She later joined the Education Research Institute of the University of Dhaka until her retirement in 1997.

Awards
 Bangla Academy Literary Award (1981)
 Bangladesh Shishu Academy Sahitya Puraskar (1999)
 Anannya Top Ten Award (2005)
 Ekushey Padak (2019)

Personal life
Khatun's only daughter, Progga Laboni, is a notable recitation artist and a book publisher. Her niece, Suborna Mustafa, is an actress.

References

1933 births
2018 deaths
People from Bagerhat District
University of Dhaka alumni
University of Rajshahi alumni
University of Northern Colorado alumni
Bengali language movement activists
Bangladeshi women writers
Bangladeshi women academics
Recipients of Bangla Academy Award
Recipients of the Ekushey Padak
Burials at Mirpur Martyred Intellectual Graveyard